The Joey Bishop Show is an American talk show that had its first broadcast on ABC on April 17, 1967, hosted by Joey Bishop and featuring Regis Philbin in his first ongoing role with national television exposure, as Bishop's sidekick/announcer.  Created to challenge The Tonight Show Starring Johnny Carson, the show lasted 33 months, with the last show airing on December 26, 1969.
 
Bishop was part of the legendary 1960s entertainment phenomenon "the Rat Pack", and other members Dean Martin, Sammy Davis, Jr. and Peter Lawford occasionally appeared on his show, sometimes as unbilled surprises, though Frank Sinatra never did.

Famously, sidekick/announcer Regis Philbin walked off the program as a result of the continuous drubbing he had been receiving from critics, stating that the network never wanted him and he feared that he was injuring the series, but he soon returned. This proved to be one of the few installments of the series to top The Tonight Show in the ratings.  In 2011, Philbin revealed that Bishop had conceived the walk-off as a stunt.

The show was created to challenge The Tonight Show Starring Johnny Carson, which Bishop frequently guest hosted in its early seasons. Unable to attract high ratings, the show was cancelled after two seasons. The program was shown five nights a week, Monday through Friday, with Carson as competition on NBC and, briefly, The Las Vegas Show hosted by Bill Dana on the short-lived U/United Network, and Merv Griffin also hosting a talk show on CBS, all in the same time slot, from 11:30 pm to 1:00 am. Jack Paar appeared on one of the early broadcasts as a kind of co-host as a favor to Bishop.

The show ended on December 26, 1969, with Bishop leaving after his monologue, declaring that this was the last show. Philbin was left to finish the final episode.  The time slot was filled by The Dick Cavett Show. Within two years, Bishop was once again a regular guest host on The Tonight Show.

See also
 The Joey Bishop Show – A situation comedy starring Bishop that ran on NBC from 1961 to 1964, and on CBS from 1964 to 1965.

References

External links
  
 

1967 American television series debuts
1969 American television series endings
American television talk shows
American Broadcasting Company original programming
American late-night television shows
English-language television shows
ABC late-night programming
1960s American late-night television series
Television shows filmed in Los Angeles